The Mosby-Bennett House is a historic house in Memphis, Tennessee. It was built in the Antebellum era. It is listed on the National Register of Historic Places.

History
The house was built in 1852 for Joseph and Samuel Mosby. The Mosbys owned 5,000 acres in Shelby County, and they were absentee owners. The house was rented by William Lawrence Hall in the Antebellum years.

During the American Civil War of 1861–1865, Union Army General Ulysses S. Grant is rumored to have stayed in the house prior to the Battle of Shiloh.

The house was purchased by George Bennett, a horse breeder, in 1870. It was later owned by the Smith family, followed by several others. The house is currently owned by R. Sadler Bailey, Esq. and is the home of Bailey & Greer, PLLC.

Architectural significance
The house was designed in the Greek Revival and Victorian architectural styles. It has been listed on the National Register of Historic Places since May 27, 1980.

References

Houses on the National Register of Historic Places in Tennessee
National Register of Historic Places in Shelby County, Tennessee
Greek Revival architecture in Tennessee
Victorian architecture in Tennessee
Houses completed in 1852